The Ercheiini are a tribe of moths in the family Erebidae.

Taxonomy
The tribe may be most closely related to the tribe Hulodini, also within the Erebinae.

Genera

Anophiodes
Ercheia

References

 
Erebinae
Moth tribes